The national emblem of the Kabardino-Balkarian Autonomous Soviet Socialist Republic was adopted in 1937 by the government of the Kabardino-Balkarian Autonomous Soviet Socialist Republic. The emblem is identical to the emblem of the Russian Soviet Federative Socialist Republic.

History

First revision 
On June 24, 1937, the Extraordinary 10th Congress of Soviets of the Kabardino-Balkarian ASSR adopted the Constitution of the Kabardino-Balkarian ASSR. The Article 10 of the constitution described the emblem of the Kabardino-Balkarian ASSR:

Second revision 
On 1937, the Kabardian language changed its method of writing to Cyrilic letters. The Ltin script was still used for the Balkarian language. In accordance with the amendments of the Constitution of the Kabardino-Balkarian ASSR on 1937, the inscriptions on the arms and flag were:РСФСР - РСФСР - RSFSRКабардино-Балкарская АССР (in Russian)Къабардей-Балэкъар АССР (in Kabardian)Qabartь - Balqar ASSR (in Balkar)

Third revision 
On July 26, 1938, the Supreme Council of the Kabardino-Balkarain ASSR adopted the Law of the Kabardino-Balkarian ASSR "On Amending Articles 44, 63, 111 and 112 of the Constitution of the Kabardino-Balkarian ASSR". The Article 3 of the law read:

Fourth revision 
Since 1939 the name in the Kabardian language has been changed, from "Къабардей-Балэкъар АССР" to "Къэбэрдей-Балъкъэр А.С.С.Р".

Fifth revision (as the Kabardin ASSR) 
From October 1942 to January 1943 the territory of the Kabardino-Balkarian ASSR was occupied by German troops. After the Soviet Army liberated the territory of the Kabardino-Balkar, the OGPU and the NKVD accused the entire Balkar people cooperating with the Nazis and, on the decision of the State Defense Committee of the USSR, on February 23, 1944, all the Balkar population was deported to Central Asia. 

On July 10, 1945, the law of the Kabardino-Balkarian ASSR "On Amending the Constitution of the Kabardino-Balkari ASSR" changed the name of the republic to the Kabardin ASSR, which was reflected in the descriptions of the arms and flag in articles 111 and 112 of the Constitution of the KASSR, of which references to Balkaria and Balkar language were removed. The inscription on the coat of arms and the flag during this period looked like this:
Р.С.Ф.С.Р
Кабардинская А.С.С.Р.
Къэбэрдей А.С.С.Р.

After the 20th Congress of the CPSU, on November 24, 1956, the CPSU Central Committee adopted a resolution "On Restoring the National Autonomy of the Kalmyk, Karachai, Balkar, Chechen and Ingush Peoples", a sweeping accusation of betrayal from the Balkarian people was lifted and the Balkars were allowed to return to their former place of residence.

Sixth revision (as the Kabardino-Balkarian ASSR) 
On January 9, 1957, the Presidium of the Supreme Soviet of the USSR issued a decree "On the transformation of the Kabardin ASSR into the Kabardino-Balkarian ASSR", approved on February 11, 1957 by the Law of the USSR. The law of the KABSSR of 29 March 1957 on the State Emblem of the KABSSR contained inscriptions: "Кабардино-Балкарская АССР/ Къэбэрдей-Балъкъэр АССР/ Къабарты-Малкъар АССР". The new name "Kabardin-Malkar ASSR" reflects the new name of the Balkarian people in the Balkar language - "Malkar", which comes from the ethnonym Balkarian population of the Chereksky Gorge - "Malkar".

Seventh revision 
On May 26, 1978, the extraordinary 8th session of the Supreme Council of the Kabardino-Balkarian ASSR adopted the new Constitution of the Kabardino-Balkarian ASSR. The article 157 of the constitution added a red five-pointed star to the emblem.

Gallery

References 

Kabardino-Balkarian Autonomous Soviet Socialist Republic
Kabardino-Balkarian ASSR
Kabardino-Balkarian ASSR
Kabardino-Balkarian ASSR
Kabardino-Balkarian ASSR
Kabardino-Balkarian ASSR